Acanthametropodidae is a family of sand-dwelling mayflies in the order Ephemeroptera. There are at least two genera and four described species in Acanthametropodidae.

Genera
These two genera belong to the family Acanthametropodidae:
 Acanthametropus Tshernova, 1948
 Analetris Edmunds, 1972

References

Further reading

 
 
 
 

Mayflies
Articles created by Qbugbot